The 2014-2018 Toronto City Council consisted of councillors elected in the 2014 municipal election, as well as subsequent by-elections and appointments.

Leadership
The Mayor of Toronto for this term (2014-2018) is John Tory. In December 2014, Mayor Tory appointed four Deputy Mayors:

 Denzil Minnan-Wong - Deputy Mayor
 Vincent Crisanti – Deputy Mayor, west
 Glenn De Baeremaeker – Deputy Mayor, east
 Pam McConnell – Deputy Mayor, central

Ms. McConnell died during her term in office and was replaced by Ana Bailão. Mayor Tory removed Crisanti after Crisanti endorsed a political rival to Tory, and was replaced by Stephen Holyday.

City  council

References

Municipal government of Toronto
2014 establishments in Ontario
2010s in Toronto